Marathokampos is a town, municipal unit, and a former municipality on the island of Samos, North Aegean, Greece. Since the 2019 local government reform it is part of the municipality West Samos, of which it is a municipal unit. The population is 2,609 (2011 census) and the land area is 87.250 km². It shares the island of Samos with the municipal units of Vathy, Pythagoreio, and Karlovasi. It is the smallest of the four in both land area and population.

Communities 
The municipal unit contains five communities (κοινότητες, koinótites).

References

External links
Official website 

Populated places in Samos